West Ravendale is a hamlet in the civil parish of East Ravendale , in North East Lincolnshire, England, and approximately  south-west from the town of Grimsby.

The ruins of West Ravendale Priory are located here. It was a small Alien house of the Premonstratensian Order. It belonged to Beaufort Abbey in Brittany. The site is a scheduled monument and Grade II listed.

References

External links

Hamlets in Lincolnshire
Borough of North East Lincolnshire